Durham was an electoral district of the Legislative Assembly of the Parliament of the Province of Canada, in Canada West, on the north shore of Lake Ontario. It was created in 1841, upon the establishment of the Province of Canada by the union of Upper Canada and Lower Canada. Durham was represented by one member in the Legislative Assembly.  It was abolished in 1867, upon the creation of Canada and the province of Ontario.

Boundaries 

Durham electoral district was based on Durham County, on the north shore of Lake Ontario, in Canada West (now the province of Ontario), east of what is now Toronto. Oshawa and Port Hope were two of the main towns.

The Union Act, 1840 had merged the two provinces of Upper Canada and Lower Canada into the Province of Canada, with a single Parliament.  The separate parliaments of Lower Canada and Upper Canada were abolished.Union Act, 1840, 3 & 4 Vict., c. 35, s. 2.  The Union Act provided that the pre-existing electoral boundaries of Upper Canada would continue to be used in the new Parliament, unless altered by the Union Act itself.

Durham County had been an electoral district in the Legislative Assembly of Upper Canada, and its boundaries were not altered by the Act. Those boundaries had been initially been set by the first Lieutenant Governor of Upper Canada, John Graves Simcoe, in 1792:

The boundaries were further defined by a statute of Upper Canada in 1798, and modified by an additional statute in 1834:

In 1834, the townships of Verulam, Fenelon and Eldon were added to Durham County.

Since Durham was not changed by the Union Act, those boundaries continued to be used for the new electoral district.

Members of the Legislative Assembly 

Durham was represented by one member in the Legislative Assembly. The following were the members for Durham.

Abolition 

The district was abolished on July 1, 1867, when the British North America Act, 1867 came into force, creating Canada and splitting the Province of Canada into Quebec and Ontario.  It was split into two electoral districts at both the federal level and the provincial level:  Durham East and Durham West in the House of Commons of Canada, Durham East and Durham West in the Legislative Assembly of Ontario.

References 

.

Electoral districts of Canada West